is a fighting video game developed by Team Ninja and published by Tecmo. It debuted in arcades in 1999 and was later ported for the Dreamcast and the PlayStation 2 in 2000. It is the second main entry in the Dead or Alive fighting series. Several enhanced editions of the game were released, including the updates Dead or Alive 2 Millennium and Dead or Alive 2 Hardcore.

The game's plot focuses on the evil tengu, Gohyakumine Bankotsubo, who escaped from the tengu world into the human world, and the Dead or Alive tournament's change in purpose and significance after the murder of DOATEC's founder and CEO, Fame Douglas.

Dead or Alive 2 improved upon the graphics engine of its predecessor by using the Sega NAOMI hardware and on the gameplay system by including many new features, leading to universal acclaim and strong sales. The game was followed by Dead or Alive 3 in 2001.

In 2004, DOA2 was remade for the Xbox as part of Dead or Alive Ultimate. On August 22, 2012, DOA2: Hard*Core was made available as a downloadable game on the Japanese PlayStation Network. The North American version was released on the US PlayStation Network on March 24, 2015.

Gameplay

In Dead or Alive 2, the basis of the entire fighting system is the circular relationship between three types of moves: blows, throws, and holds; blows beating throws, throws beating holds, and holds beating blows. The other defining feature of the game, aside from blows/throws/holds, is its stun system. Many attacks can inflict a stun on the opponent; those stunned cannot attack or guard, however they can hold. If the attacker lands a non-knockdown, non-launching attack while the opponent is stunned, the opponent will be re-stunned in a new way, depending on what attack was landed.

A major difference between DOA2 and other fighters was in the safety and non-punishability of attacks, both upon hitting and upon being blocked. Most blows in DOA2 can be punished on hit and block by each character's faster throws, making blow-based offense very risky. In addition to the normal rules of juggling, each character also fits into a specific weight category, which affects how the character responds to being launched and being juggled.

In DOA2, fights can occur on either water or ice; when a character is on such a surface, all non-knockdown, non-launching attacks will induce a stun on any successful hit. Walls and falls in the middle of stages are everywhere in the game. Many stages are also multi-tiered: to get to other areas of the stage, one character must be knocked off a ledge and fall into the next area. These falls deal usually fairly high damage, but cannot knock the opponent out.

DOA2 offers a new mode called Tag Battle Mode which implements a Tag team fighting system that allows players to choose two fighters to form a team, and fight against another team controlled by either the computer, or by other players. Tag Battle Mode allows characters to switch back and forth instantaneously for combo attacks and even attack simultaneously when timed correctly. Everyone can be partnered to anyone and the mode allows for the participation of four players, something not common in the fighting game genre. DOA2'''s Tag Battle Mode offers Tag Throws which are special throws unique to pairs of characters. Tag partners perform throws together on their opponent and these special throws do a great amount of damage to the opponent.

Other notable features included introducing CG cutscenes in line with the plot, replacing the original "Danger Zone" areas in stages with fully interactive ones, allowing players to juggle each other into walls, propelling characters from landmarks for more damage (the first game to implement this feature was SNK's Samurai Shodown 64), and upon completing the game, presenting the player with (sometimes ambiguous) endings for each character using the game's standard engine.

CharactersDead or Alive 2 features a total of 15 fighters, 14 playable fighters and the unplayable Kasumi X. Two of them are unlockable and cannot be used in story mode or in the arcade version. The ten returning veterans from the first DOA game are Ayane, Bass Armstrong, Bayman (unlockable), Gen Fu, Jann Lee, Kasumi, Leifang, Ryu Hayabusa, Tina Armstrong, and Zack. The four newcomers are Ein, Helena Douglas, Leon, and Tengu (unlockable boss).

New
Ein, a merciless karateka who was left to die in the esoteric Black forest of Germany. Now with serious amnesia, he cannot remember his past life and aims to find answers to his self-discovery through participation in the second tournament.
Helena Douglas, a French opera singer, piguaquan practitioner, and the illegitimate daughter of the founder and former DOATEC leader, Fame Douglas, whose recent assassination has pulled Helena into despair. Her mother, while accompanying her daughter on stage at the Opera House, took a bullet meant for Helena. Helena vowed to seek revenge on the assassin. Discovering that the murder of both her parents is somehow related to DOATEC, she joins the second tournament, determined to find the assassin.
Kasumi X (unplayable), a clone of Kasumi created by the DOATEC Super-human Development Project.
Leon, an Italian mercenary soldier and Russian martial arts practitioner who wanders all over the world. His lover Rolande, a thief who worked the Silk Road, died in his arms murmuring that he, the man she loves is the strongest man in the world. In order to fulfill the last words of Rolande, Leon enters the tournament, aspired to be the strongest man on earth.
Tengu (unlockable), real name Gohyakumine Bankotsubo; an evil tengu of the tengu world who murdered his leader, Kuramasan Maouson. He enters the human world to create chaos and make it reign over the world.

Returning

Ayane
Bass Armstrong
Bayman (unlockable)
Gen Fu
Jann Lee
Kasumi
Leifang
Ryu Hayabusa
Tina Armstrong
Zack

Plot
Fame Douglas, founder and CEO of DOATEC was killed at the end of the 20th century. He was renowned as the sponsor of the legendary Dead or Alive World Combat Championship. After his death, the world began to become chaotic. In the middle of the chaos, it was announced that the second Dead or Alive World Combat Championship will be held.

The purpose and significance of the tournament changed after Douglas' death. The promoter of the second Dead or Alive Championship, who is fond of conflicts and jealous of the strong, is responsible for Douglas's death. The new promoter, Victor Donovan, is more than a corrupt mastermind, but a man of pure evil. His involvement in the tournament began to bring a sense of terror to the world, resulting in the infamous tengu disaster.

Set less than a year later after the original tournament, an evil tengu known as Gohyakumine Bankotsubo, or just Tengu, escapes from the tengu world and threatens the human world's peace and stability. Tengu considers all functions of the human world to be insignificant, and claims that all disasters are nothing more than illusions he has brought about. Kasumi, who won the first tournament was captured by the DOATEC Super-human Development Project and was unwillingly used in the organization's attempt to develop a physical body with superhuman abilities. Kasumi escapes, but her clone "Kasumi X" was created while she was being held captive. Kasumi's brother Hayate, previously injured by Raidou, was also captured and was unwillingly used as a subject of DOATEC's bio-weapon experiment, Epsilon. Modifications were made to Hayate's nervous system, but failed to produce an improvement in the project. As a result, the experiment became a failure.

Ryu Hayabusa (from Ninja Gaiden) enters the tournament vowing to seek and destroy the evil tengu. Though a dangerous, suicidal task for any ordinary man, Hayabusa owes it to himself and to mankind to confront his fate. Hayabusa tries to warn other competitors like Jann Lee about the dangers of the tournament, but finds them unwilling to backdown, so he proceeds to knock them out of the tournament. He later meets a competitor named Ein, who is actually the missing Hayate suffering from amnesia. During their fight, Hayabusa defeats him and restores some semblance of his memory. Eventually, Hayabusa comes face to face with the evil Tengu. He defeats and kills Tengu, winning the tournament.

Development and release

The graphics and gameplay were enhanced and based on a better game engine than the one used in the first game. Running on the Sega NAOMI arcade board, it allowed the characters and stages to appear less angular and more detailed. A popular and commonly discussed feature, one credited to Tomonobu Itagaki, was the level of graphical detail Tecmo put into the animated breasts of the female characters, as Tecmo went so far as to create a physics engine dedicated entirely to the animation of the female characters' breasts.Dead or Alive 2 used the song "Exciter" by Bomb Factory in its opening sequence. Also used as a background track was "Deadly Silence Beach" and "Clumsy Bird". Both "Exciter" and "Deadly Silence Beach" can be found on the self-titled mini-album Bomb Factory and on the Dead or Alive 2 Soundtrack.

Two soundtrack CDs were released in 2000 by Wake Up in Japan: Dead or Alive 2 Original Sound Trax (KWCD-1001) and Dead or Alive 2 Original Sound Trax (KWCD-1004). Two guide books for the game were published in North America by Prima Games (Dead or Alive 2: Prima's Official Strategy Guide and DOA2: Hardcore: Prima's Official Strategy Guide). Several Japanese guide books for the game were also published by SoftBank (Dead or Alive 2 Perfect Guide, Dead or Alive 2 Perfect Guide Dreamcast Ban, Dead or Alive 2 Hard Core Perfect Guide) and Dengeki (Dead or Alive 2 Kōshiki Kōryaku Guide, Dead or Alive 2 Kōshiki Kōryaku & Girls, Dead or Alive 2 Hard Core Kōshiki Kōryaku Guide).

Home versions
Nine different versions (excluding DOA2 Ultimate on Xbox and the two PSN releases) of Dead or Alive 2 were released: two for the arcade market, and the others were home versions. Tomonobu Itagaki and Team Ninja were constantly enhancing the game for both the Dreamcast and PlayStation 2 as they worked towards their vision of the "ultimate fighting game".

The Dreamcast port was first released in North America on February 29, 2000. It was identical to the arcade Millennium update release, but added the usual Versus and Sparring modes, as well as Team Battle Mode. This version also featured a simplified hold system compared to the one in the arcade versions. Unlike home ports of the first Dead or Alive game, there were no unlockables in this release. Dead or Alive 2 was the only game that Tecmo published on the Dreamcast.Dead or Alive 2 was released on March 30, 2000, as a launch title for the PlayStation 2 in Japan. This version added new stages (Crimson, Koku An and Prairie) and new unlockable costumes. The game engine ran using Field Rendering instead of Frame Rendering, thus it appeared much more aliased than the Dreamcast ports. This version was buggy and prone to lock up in Versus mode.
Itagaki and his team were only given two months initially to produce the first PlayStation 2 port. At the end of this, one of his managers asked to borrow a copy to play, but instead sent in to a production factory. Itagaki was upset by not being able to finish the game on his own terms and fell into a depression during which he briefly considered quitting the industry.

The European Dreamcast version was released on May 26, 2000. This version included the costumes from the Japanese PlayStation 2 version, but not the new stages. It also added new costumes for Zack and Tina, which pay homage to The Shadow Man and his love interest from the Shadow Man series. Acclaim developed the Shadow Man video game and published Dead or Alive 2 in Europe.

The Japanese Dreamcast version (known as the Limited Edition) was released on September 28, 2000. Cover art featured Kasumi and Ayane, along with a standard cover art version with Kasumi, Ayane and Leifang. The most notable addition was that Bankotsubo and Bayman were now unlockable, playable in all but Story Mode. The new stages from the PlayStation 2 version were not included, in favor of new versions of Burai Zenin and L's Castle stages from the first game. This version also added Sparring mode for Tag Battle, Watch Mode, the User Profile System, online play, more costumes to unlock, and a Gallery Mode with character renders.

On October 25, 2000, Tecmo released DOA2: Hardcore (DOA2: Dead or Alive 2 in Europe) for the PlayStation 2 in America and Europe, which was based on the Japanese second update of Dead or Alive 2 for Dreamcast. This version was featuring new playable characters, new stages, extra costumes and introduced the "Gallery" option. The Hardcore release was finally the complete game Itagaki had envisioned at the time, featuring many changes compared to its predecessor: Characters, pictures and moves were altered to appear more realistic, lessening the anime-look. Some fighting animations were elaborated upon, while others were cut. New stages were added (8 more than the Dreamcast update). More character outfits were added. Survival Mode now only took place in the "Danger Zone" arena. Overall gameplay speed was increased, and the entire game (including cutscenes) now ran at a full 60 frames-per-second (in the Dreamcast version, the game ran at 60fps, while cutscenes ran at 30). 

A special "Items Collection" feature and menu section was added to appeal to video game collectors. New artworks were added, and a CG Gallery section featuring renders of the female characters was added. The player history files were enhanced, and now included statistics on how often the player used each character, and tag battle pairing. Several special moves were added, but left undocumented. English voice-overs were added in addition to the original Japanese voice-overs, making it the first game in the series to have English voice-overs. Kasumi can be unlocked as a trainable 'monster' in Monster Rancher 4 by going to the Shrine, and inserting the DOA2: Hardcore disk in the PS2.

Tecmo followed up on the release of Hardcore in the US and Europe with the release of DOA2: Hard*Core in Japan. This last version saw some minor updates, including new cutscenes, a few new costumes, a new turbo speed option, and a second opening sequence which features an English version of the Bomb Factory song "How Do You Feel". This was the last Dead or Alive game to be released for a Sony system, as the series became exclusive to the Xbox until the release of Dead or Alive Paradise, Dead or Alive: Dimensions, and Dead or Alive 5 respectively.

Re-release
On August 22, 2012, a software emulated version of DOA2: Hard*Core was made available as a downloadable game on the Japanese PlayStation Network. The North American version was released to the US PlayStation Network on March 24, 2015.

ReceptionDead or Alive 2 brought more than $2 million profit in sales. As of 2022, DOA2 is considered one of the best Fighting games in the genre in terms of gameplay and expanded game modes . In Japan, Game Machine listed Dead or Alive 2 on their December 15, 1999 issue as being the second most-successful arcade game of the month. At console release, the Dreamcast version was met with universal acclaim, while the PlayStation 2 version was very well received. Both versions were praised for its graphics, cutscenes and gameplay. Main criticism was the poor English voice dub used in the North American and European PS2 versions of the game. (much like other English dub Japanese video games)

Greg Orlando reviewed the Dreamcast version of the game for Next Generation, rating it five stars out of five, and stated that "You'd have to be Dead and Buried not be enjoy Dead or Alive 2. Gorgeous graphics, excellent gameplay, and some beautiful characters put this square in the running against Namco's Soul Calibur as the best Dreamcast fighting game."

Jeff Lundrigan reviewed the PlayStation 2 version of the game for Next Generation, rating it five stars out of five, and stated that "This is a tremendous game and a must-have, but if you can choose between the two versions, PS2 enjoys an edge thanks to all the extras – just get used to squinting at the too-bright lights and nasty jaggies.": Jeff Lundrigan also reviewed the PlayStation 2 re-release of Dead or Alive 2 titled DOA2: Hardcore for Next Generation, rating it five stars out of five, and stated that "This is the best-looking, most full-featured, most packed-with-extras version of one of the best fighting games ever made. Buy it, period."Dead or Alive 2 was awarded "Console Fighting Game of the Year" and was nominated for "Outstanding Achievement in Animation" by the Academy of Interactive Arts & Sciences. The game was nominated for "Best Fighting Game" at E3's Game Critics Awards. Hardcore was a runner-up for GameSpot's annual "Best Graphics, Technical" and "Best Fighting Game" awards among console games, but lost respectively to Shenmue and Capcom vs. SNK: Millennium Fight 2000.GamesRadar+ included the game on their list of best Dreamcast games, stating that "Dead or Alive's first sequel used separate graphics engines for its fighting and cut-scenes, allowing for unprecedented graphical fidelity." In 2010, UGO.com ranked it as the ninth top fighting game of all time, "perhaps most important for introducing Itagaki's famous breast physics engine."

RemakeDead or Alive Ultimate is a remake of DOA and DOA2 for the Xbox with a greatly improved graphics engine. As it was created after Dead or Alive 3, it takes elements and mechanics from both its original iteration and successor. The action of 3D-axis movement is as free-formatted as DOA3, and Hitomi, as well as Tengu are now playable characters (albeit outside story mode), but other elements have been kept intact from DOA2. The biggest set of changes instituted in Dead or Alive Ultimate'' are online play over Xbox Live and the inclusion of slopes, which are a type of environmental hazard.

References
  Content in this article was copied from Dead or Alive 2 at the Dead or Alive wiki, which is licensed under the Creative Commons Attribution-Share Alike 3.0 (Unported) (CC-BY-SA 3.0) license.

External links

Tecmo websites: DOA2 for the PlayStation 2, DOA2 for the Dreamcast, DOA2 Hardcore

1999 video games
3D fighting games
Acclaim Entertainment games
Arcade video games
Dead or Alive (franchise) video games
Dreamcast games
Interactive Achievement Award winners
PlayStation 2 games
PlayStation 3 games
PlayStation Network games
Sony Interactive Entertainment games
Tecmo games
Fighting games
Tag team videogames
Martial arts video games
Video games about amnesia
Video games with AI-versus-AI modes
Video games about ninja
Video games about revenge
Science fiction video games
Video game sequels
Video games developed in Japan
Video games featuring female protagonists
Head-to-head arcade video games
Video games set in China
Video games set in the United States
Video games set in Germany
Video games set in Japan
Video games set in the 21st century
Video games set in the future
Video games with alternative versions
D.I.C.E. Award for Fighting Game of the Year winners
Koei Tecmo games